George A. "Ropes" Kerr (November 10, 1894 – December 1980) was a professional football player.  He played in the National Football League with the  Cleveland Tigers and the New York Brickley Giants. He also played in the first American Football League in 1926 for the Newark Bears.

Notes

1894 births
1980 deaths
American football guards
American football tackles
Cleveland Tigers (NFL) players
New York Brickley Giants players
Newark Bears (AFL) players